Robert Citerne (born 10 February 1961 in Paris) is a French wheelchair fencer, who earned four gold medals out of seven Paralympic participations. He is also three-time World champion and eight-time European champion in individual and team events.

Citerne has right hemiplegia since he was six months old. He took up fencing at the age of 19 after his physical therapist suggested it to him. He joined in 1987 the France national team, of which he is still a member. He is known in the fencing community as “Bob le Ouf”, literally “Crazy Bob” because of his exuberant personality.

Citerne is IT manager at the Levallois Sporting Club, of which he is a member as an athlete. He is also city councillor of La Garenne-Colombes in charge of disability-related issues.

References

External links

 
 
 

1961 births
Living people
French male foil fencers
French male épée fencers
Paralympic gold medalists for France
Paralympic silver medalists for France
Paralympic bronze medalists for France
Wheelchair fencers at the 1992 Summer Paralympics
Wheelchair fencers at the 1996 Summer Paralympics
Wheelchair fencers at the 2000 Summer Paralympics
Wheelchair fencers at the 2004 Summer Paralympics
Wheelchair fencers at the 2008 Summer Paralympics
Wheelchair fencers at the 2012 Summer Paralympics
Medalists at the 1988 Summer Paralympics
Medalists at the 1992 Summer Paralympics
Medalists at the 1996 Summer Paralympics
Medalists at the 2000 Summer Paralympics
Medalists at the 2004 Summer Paralympics
Fencers from Paris
Paralympic medalists in wheelchair fencing
French male sabre fencers
Paralympic wheelchair fencers of France